The ASM-3 is a supersonic anti-ship missile being developed by Mitsubishi Heavy Industries to replace the ASM-1 and ASM-2 missiles. The major launch platform is the Mitsubishi F-2. Planned Initial Operational Capability was 2016. The missile will be used by the Japan Air Self-Defense Force. It can attack not only ships, but also ground targets. Since the original model of ASM3 had a short range of 200 km, it was not deployed immediately, and an improved model was developed from 2017 to 2020, and deployment of (ASM3a) with a range of about 300～400 km started in 2021.  In the future, it may also have a range of 400 km or more.

In November 2015, Japan's Ministry of Defense announced it would conduct a live-fire experiment of the XASM-3 in 2016, targeting the decommissioned ship JDS Shirane. In February 2017, an F-2 carried out a jettison test of the missile as a precursor to a live firing. Mass production was planned to begin in 2018 but stopped due to the further upgrade program that has been planned. Footage of a test launch was released in August 2017.

Improvement program
Despite its development being completed in 2017 the missile was not deployed because its range (200 km) was deemed too short. The extended range is believed to be developed in response to countering the Chinese Navy's long range air-defense. The missile may be used by the F-2's successor once the aircraft retires in the 2030s.

In December 2019, the Japanese Defense Ministry secured ￥10.3 billion to upgrade the missile in the 2020 budget. It is planned to extend the range without resizing.

In December 2020, Japan MoD announced ASM-3A, which has been derived by reflecting the achievements from the development process of ASM-3 (Kai), and will mass-produce it with the 2021 defense budget. Upgrade version of ASM-3A, ASM-3 (Kai), will be continuously developed according to the schedule.

Variants
ASM-3A - Extended range version of ASM-3.
ASM-3 Kai(改) - Improved version of ASM-3A.

See also

 Type 80 Air-to-Ship Missile
 Type 88 Surface-to-Ship Missile
 Type 90 Ship-to-Ship Missile
 Type 93 Air-to-Ship Missile

Comparable missiles
Kh-31
Kh-41
Kh-61
YJ-91
YJ-12
Hsiung Feng III
ANS (anti navire supersonique, cancelled French project)

References

External links
 Policy evaluation reports

Anti-ship missiles of Japan
Anti-ship cruise missiles